Björn Schröder (born 27 October 1980 in Berlin) is a German professional road bicycle racer, who currently competes for Team Stölting.

Career achievements

Major results

Cyclo-cross

1995–1996
2nd National Under-17 Championships
1996–1997
3rd National Under-19 Championships
1999–2000
3rd National Under-23 Championships
2000–2001
2nd National Under-23 Championships
2001–2002
2nd National Under-23 Championships

Road

2002
2nd National Hill Climb Championships
2003
Circuit des Mines
1st Stages 5 & 7
2004
1st Stage 5 Sachsen Tour
2005
1st Stage 3 Sachsen Tour
2006
1st Stage 5 Bayern-Rundfahrt
2007
7th Overall 3-Länder-Tour
2008
1st Overall Rothaus Regio-Tour
1st GP Buchholz
9th Neuseen Classics
2009
7th Scheldeprijs
2011
1st Overall Grand Prix of Sochi
6th Overall Five Rings of Moscow
2012
9th ProRace Berlin

External links
 

1980 births
Living people
German male cyclists
Cyclists from Berlin
21st-century German people